Liberec railway station is a railway station in the city of Liberec, the capital of the Liberec Region, Czech Republic.

History and description 

The railway station was built in 1859 as a part of connection between Liberec and Pardubice to the south, and Zittau to the north. The project was realised by Společnost Pardubicko-liberecké dráhy (Pardubice-Liberec Railway Company). In 1900 the station area had to be improved because of a new line to Česká Lípa. A second large reconstruction was completed in 2009–11.

All five platforms are equipped with elevators and audiovisual information systems. Daily express trains link Liberec with Děčín, Ústí nad Labem, Hradec Králové and Pardubice, but there is no direct connection to Prague. The private company Die Länderbahn run services branded Trilex which connect Liberec with Zittau and Dresden.

Other frequented stations in the city are Liberec-Horní Růžodol on line 086 and Liberec-Rochlice on line 036.

Services
The station is served by two express routes operated by Czech Railways.

References

External links 
 Basic information and map (Czech)
 Information page on České dráhy webside (Czech)
 Online time schedule of the station (Czech)
 Detailed history of rail transport in Liberec (Czech)

Railway stations opened in 1859
Railway stations in Liberec Region
19th-century establishments in Bohemia
Buildings and structures in Liberec
Railway stations in the Czech Republic opened in the 19th century